Orhan Alp (1919 – 21 January 2010) was a Turkish mechanical engineer, politician and former government minister.

Orhan Alp was born in Isparta, Ottoman Empire in 1919. He graduated from the Technical University of Berlin. Between 1942 and 1964 he served in the Turkish State Railways (TCDD). In 1964, he resigned from the TCDD, and briefly served in the Middle East Technical University as a lecturer.

Political career
Alp joined the Justice Party (AP).  Although he was not a parliament member in 1965, he was appointed as the Minister of Public Works in the 29th government of Turkey on 20 February 1965, and served until 27 October 1965.  In the 1965 general election, he was elected into the 13th Parliament of Turkey as a deputy from Ankara Province. Following a government reshuffle,  he was reappointed as the Minister of Public Works in the 30th government of Turkey on 3 April 1967, and served until 3 November 1969.

In the 1973 and the 1977 general elections, he was reelected into the 15th and the 16th Parliament of Turkey. But in 1977, he resigned from the Justice Party, and continued as an independent parliament member. In the 42nd government of Turkey, he served as the Minister of Industry between 5 January 1978 and 12 November 1979.

He died in Ankara on 21 January 2010.

References

1919 births
People from Isparta
Technical University of Berlin alumni
Turkish mechanical engineers
Turkish civil servants
Academic staff of Middle East Technical University
Justice Party (Turkey) politicians
Members of the 13th Parliament of Turkey
Members of the 15th government of Turkey
Members of the 16th government of Turkey
Members of the 29th government of Turkey
Members of the 30th government of Turkey
Members of the 42nd government of Turkey
Ministers of Public Works of Turkey
Ministers of Science Industry and Technology of Turkey
2010 deaths
Turkish expatriates in Germany